The 2002–03 Eastern Michigan Eagles men's basketball team represented Eastern Michigan University during the 2002–03 NCAA Division I men's basketball season. The Eagles, led by 3rd year head coach Jim Boone. The Eagles played their home games at the Eastern Michigan University Convocation Center and were members of the West Division of the Mid-American Conference. They finished the season 14–14, 8–10 in MAC play. They finished 4th in the MAC West. They were knocked out in the 1st round of the MAC Tournament by Marshall.

Roster
Source:

The team captains were Ricky Cottrill, Steve Pettyjohn, and Ryan Prillman.

Schedule

Source:

Awards
Academic All-MAC
 Steve Pettyjohn

2nd Team All-MAC
 Ryan Prillman

E-Club Hall of Fame Inductees
 Jim Dutcher

Season Highlights

11–26 vs Robert Morris 
 Win marks EMU's first home opening win since 1999–2000. 
 Markus Austin scores career high 36 points. 
 RMU's Maurice Cooper sets new Convocation Center record with 42 points. 
 Ryan Prillman ties career high with 24 points.

12/21 vs Gardner-Webb 
 EMU posts first 5–1 start since 1996–97 season. 
 James Jackson posts new career high in rebounds with 13.

01/14 vs Bowling Green 
 First EMU victory over BGSU since 1/29/98

01/21 vs Ball State 
 Ryan Prillman sets a new career high with 28 points.

02/19 at Ohio 
 EMU picks up first win in Athens since Mar. 2, 1988.

03/04 vs Buffalo 
 EMU set a record for the most free throws attempted with 54, and ties the record for free throws made with 34.

03/10 at Marshall 
 Michael Ross' 11 assists is tied for 4th all time in the MAC tournament.

References

Eastern Michigan Eagles men's basketball seasons
Eastern Michigan
2002 in sports in Michigan
2003 in sports in Michigan